Avirett–Stephens Plantation is a historic slave plantation complex and national historic district located near Richlands, Onslow County, North Carolina. The plantation house was built in 1851, and is a two-story, five bay, double-pile Greek Revival style frame dwelling. It is sheathed in pine board-and-batten and sits on a brick pier foundation. It features a wide two-tiered porch with a shallow hipped roof.  Other contributing resources are antebellum cistern, family cemetery, and surrounding farmland.

It was listed on the National Register of Historic Places in 1991.

References

Plantation houses in North Carolina
Farms on the National Register of Historic Places in North Carolina
Historic districts on the National Register of Historic Places in North Carolina
Greek Revival houses in North Carolina
Houses completed in 1851
Buildings and structures in Onslow County, North Carolina
National Register of Historic Places in Onslow County, North Carolina
1851 establishments in North Carolina